The 2006 Montana State Bobcats football team was an American football team that represented Montana State University in the Big Sky Conference (Big Sky) during the 2006 NCAA Division I FCS football season. In their seventh and final season under head coach Mike Kramer, the Bobcats compiled an 8–5 record (6–2 against Big Sky opponents), tied for second place in the Big Sky, and were ranked No. 10 in the NCAA Division FCS rankings. 

After opening the season with an upset victory over Colorado of the NCAA Division I Football Bowl Subdivision (FBS), the Bobcats lost their next three games. They advanced to the NCAA Division I Football Championship playoffs, where they defeated Furman in the first round before losing to Appalachian State in the quarterfinals.

Schedule

References

Montana State
Montana State Bobcats football seasons
Montana State Bobcats football